North West Warriors is one of four provincial cricket teams in Ireland. Along with the Leinster Lightning, Northern Knights and Munster Reds, it makes up the Inter-Provincial Championship, Inter-Provincial Cup & Inter-Provincial Trophy.

The team is located in the west of Ulster province containing areas of the Republic of Ireland and Northern Ireland. The team managed by North West of Ireland Cricket Union.

History

In 2013, Cricket Ireland formed the three-day Inter-Provincial Championship, featuring teams from Leinster, the NCU and the North West. The North West team is known as the North West Warriors. On 8 April, they announced Bobby Rao as their coach.

Up to and including the 2016 Inter-Provincial Championship, the matches were not given first-class status. However, at an International Cricket Council meeting in October 2016, first-class status was awarded to all future matches.

Honours

Inter-Provincial Championship (first-class) - 1 title
 2018 Inter-Provincial Championship: Champions

Inter-Provincial Cup - (50 over)
 Best result
2017 Inter-Provincial Cup: Runners-up

Inter-Provincial Trophy (T20) - 1 title
 2014 Inter-Provincial Trophy: Champions

Players

Current squad
  denotes players with international caps.

Current and former players
List of North West Warriors cricketers''

Grounds

References

External links
North West of Ireland Cricket Union

 
Cricket in Ulster
Irish first-class cricket teams
2017 establishments in Ireland